The 2013 Traralgon Challenger was a professional tennis tournament played on outdoor hard court. It was the first edition of the tournament which was part of the 2013 ATP Challenger Tour. It took place in Traralgon, Australia between 28 October - 3 November 2013.

Singles main draw entrants

Seeds

 Rankings are as of October 21, 2013.

Other entrants
The following players received wildcards into the singles main draw:
  Maverick Banes
  Blake Mott
  Darren K. Polkinghorne
  Gavin van Peperzeel

The following players received entry from the qualifying draw:
  Sean Berman
  Brendon Moore
  Bumpei Sato
  Richard Yang

The following players received entry as a Lucky loser:
  Chanchai Sookton-Eng

Champions

Singles

 Yuki Bhambri def.  Bradley Klahn 6–7(13–15), 6–3, 6–4

Doubles

 Ryan Agar /  Adam Feeney def.  Dane Propoggia /  Jose Statham 6–3, 6–4

External links
Official Website
ATP official site

Traralgon Challenger
Latrobe City Traralgon ATP Challenger
2013 in Australian tennis